The pidkova, literally  "Horseshoe". 
In some Ukrainian folk instrument ensembles a steel horseshoe dangling from the end of a gut string is struck with a piece of metal wire. This produced a high-pitched ringing sound similar to a triangle.

See also
Ukrainian folk music

Sources

Humeniuk, A. - Ukrainski narodni muzychni instrumenty - Kyiv: Naukova dumka, 1967
Mizynec, V. - Ukrainian Folk Instruments - Melbourne: Bayda books, 1984
Cherkaskyi, L. - Ukrainski narodni muzychni instrumenty // Tekhnika, Kyiv, Ukraine, 2003 - 262 pages. 

Ukrainian musical instruments
Idiophones
Horseshoes